The Commonwealth XI cricket team played over 100 first-class cricket matches from 1949 to 1968. The team started out as a side made up of mostly English, Australian and West Indian cricketers, that toured the subcontinent but later on played first-class fixtures in England. They also toured South Africa and Rhodesia.

Tours of the Subcontinent

1949/50

The Commonwealth team, captained by Jock Livingston, played 17 first-class matches in India and two each in Ceylon and Pakistan.

1950/51

Les Ames, another Englishman, led the team on this occasion and they appeared in 25 first-class matches in India as well as two in Ceylon.

1953/54

Australian Ben Barnett captained the Commonwealth XI on this tour of India which consisted of 22 first-class matches.

1964/65

Peter Richardson's Commonwealth team played just one first-class match in India, against the Bengal Chief Minister's XI, but toured Pakistan for 14 first-class matches.

1967/68

A Commonwealth side toured Pakistan under the captaincy of Richie Benaud. Roger Prideaux and Tony Lewis captained the team in some matches.

Tours of South Africa and Rhodesia
In October 1959, the Commonwealth XI played three first-class matches in South Africa and in a tour of Rhodesia in September, 1962, they played a further two.

Matches in England
All other matches played by the Commonwealth team were in England and mostly against a side called the England XI. The only exceptions were matches against the touring Indians in 1952 and Essex in 1953.

References

External links
 First-Class Matches played by Commonwealth XI at CricketArchive

Commonwealth sports competitions
First-class cricket teams